Visions of... is a Torch studio EP, released independently on November 23, 2003 through Hardstar Records.

The band recorded a pre-production before the recording of their EP, although only 1 song would end up on the EP. B-sides includes the songs Far From Alone and Get Myself a Beer.

The album garnered good reviews, and would shortly after see them co-headlining the Taste New Norway Tour in Norway with friends Miksha and Turdus Musicus supporting the EP.

Track listing
 "Blindfold" – 2:31
 "Creation" – 3:19
 "Torn" – 3:50
 "Nu (A Love Song)" – 5:31

Personnel
Torch - Producer
Jørgen Berg and Erlend Nibe - Artwork
Marius Forbord - Vocals
Jørgen Berg - bass guitar
Erlend Nibe - guitar
Mats Paulsen - guitar
Thomas Farstad - drums

References

Torch (band) albums
2003 EPs